Monoszló (also Monozlo) was the name of a Slavonian-origin gens (Latin for "clan"; nemzetség in Hungarian) in the Kingdom of Hungary. Several prominent secular dignitaries came from this kindred.

Origins
The unidentified ancestor of the kindred received the estate of Monoszló (today Podravska Moslavina, Croatia) in Križevci County in Slavonia from Béla III of Hungary. There he was also granted the right of marturina, a type of tax in Slavonia which was collected in the then highly valued marten skins. As János Karácsonyi wrote, he had four children because Monoszló was divided into four parts in 1231 according to a property contract. One of them was Macarius, who served as ispán (head) of Szolnok County from 1192 to 1193. By 1196, he owned Szond, Bács County (today Sonta, Serbia) and married a daughter of Peter Győr from the Szenterzsébet branch.

Family tree
 N.
 Macarius I (fl. 1192–1196), ispán of Szolnok County (1192–1193)
 Thomas I (fl. 1202–1231), ispán of Valkó County (1221), Ban of Slavonia (1228–1229)
 Gregory II (fl. 1237–1256), ispán of Krassó County (1255), married a lady from the gens Bő
 Egidius II (fl. 1265–1313; d. 1313), Master of the treasury (1270–1272; 1274–1275), Ban of Bosnia (1273), Ban of Macsó (1273); married Catherine from the gens Kökényes-Radnót
 daughter (fl. 1313), married Philip Kórógyi
 daughter (fl. 1313), married Nicholas Aba from the Nyék branch
 daughter (fl. 1313–1334), married Stephen II Borsa
 daughter (fl. 1313), married Nicholas Felsőlendvai
 Gregory III (fl. 1270–1291; d. before 1294), Judge of the Cumans (1269), ispán of Vas County (1270–1272; 1273–1274), married an unidentified sister of Queen Elizabeth the Cuman
 Peter II (fl. 1266–1307; d. 1307), Bishop of Transylvania (1270–1307)
 Nabut (fl. 1237–1283), married James Héder
 daughter (fl. 1237)
 daughter (fl. 1237)
 daughter (fl. 1237)
 Thomas II (fl. 1237–1247)
 Thomas III (fl. 1256–1283)
 Kosa ((fl. 1328)
 Stephen II (fl. 1256–1293)
 Nicholas IV (fl. 1328–1338)
 Stephen "Csupor" III ((fl. 1328–1338), ancestor of the Csupor family
 Nicholas I (fl. 1217–1231)
 Stephen I (fl. 1217–1231)
 Macarius II (d. before 1247)
 sons (d. before 1247)
 Venys (fl. 1256), married Mojs I
 N.
 Gregory I (d. before 1231)
 daughter (d. before 1231)
 daughter (d. before 1231)
 N.
 Egidius I (fl. 1231)
 Peter I
 Peter III (fl. 1247–1316)
 Nicholas II
 Andrew (fl. 1231–1247)
 Nicholas III (fl. 1256–1272), Judge royal (1270–1272), Master of the horse (1272)
 Lawrence (fl. 1283–1288)
 Egidius III (fl. 1283–1288)
 Kenéz (fl. 1256–1257)
 N.

References

Sources